The Copa do Brasil de Futebol Feminino was a Brazilian Women's football competition organized by the Brazilian Football Confederation (CBF) with the help of the Brazilian Ministry of Sports. It was designed as an equivalent to the men's Copa do Brasil. The first edition was played in 2007. The competition was abolished in 2017.

Because Brazil had no national league until 2013 the winner of the 2008 to 2013 cups qualified for the Copa Libertadores Femenina, the South American Club Championship.

History
The competition was announced after FIFA president Sepp Blatter requested the creation of a professional women's football league in Brazil.

CBF canceled the competition in 2017 to make the Campeonato Brasileiro de Futebol Feminino more balanced and attractive.

Format
In 2007, the competition was contested by 32 teams, and was played from October 30, 2007, to December 9 of the same year. Copa do Brasil de Futebol Feminino's first stage is similar to the men's competition, thus being a knockout competition, played over two legs between clubs of the same region, and disputed in three rounds, but in the second stage the eight qualified clubs are divided in two groups of four teams each, playing against each other once, and held in a host city. The two best placed teams of each group qualify to the semifinals. The semifinal winners play the final while the losers play the third-place playoff. CBF determined that to be eligible to play in the competition it is necessary to be a minimum of 14 years old and a maximum of 34 years old, and half of the players of each club have to be aged between 14 and 18 years old.

The cup is contested between the state champions, some bigger states get multiple entries so there are 32 teams in total.

Referees
The Brazilian Football Confederation created a separated women's referee staff for the competition, not connected to the men's referee staff.

List of champions

See also
 Copa do Brasil, the men's version of Copa do Brasil de Futebol Feminino.

References

External links
 Copa do Brasil de Futebol Feminino official website
Cup at soccerway.com - results, fixtures

 
Defunct football cup competitions in Brazil
Brazil Women's
Women's football competitions in Brazil